Stephen Buckley (born 23 April 1959) is a former Australian rules footballer who played with Carlton and North Melbourne in the Victorian Football League (VFL). His father, Brian Buckley, and brother, Mark Buckley, also played in the VFL.

Notes

External links 

Stephen Buckley's profile at Blueseum

1959 births
Carlton Football Club players
North Melbourne Football Club players
Living people
Australian rules footballers from Victoria (Australia)